Eugene Roberts may refer to:

Eugene L. Roberts (1880–1953), American athletics coach
Eugene Roberts (neuroscientist) (1920–2016), American neuroscientist 
Gene Roberts (American football) (Eugene O. Roberts, 1923–2009), American professional football player
Gene Roberts (journalist) (Eugene Leslie Roberts Jr., born 1932), American journalist

See also
Gene Roberts (disambiguation)